Manchester Junior-Senior High School is a public high school located in North Manchester, Indiana.

Athletics
Manchester Junior-Senior High School's athletic teams are the Squires and they compete in the Three Rivers Conference. The school offers a wide range of athletics including:

Baseball
Basketball (Men's and Women's)
Cheerleading
Cross Country 
Football
Golf (Men's and Women's)
Soccer (Men's and Women's)
Swimming
Tennis (Men's and Women's)
Track (Men's and Women's)
Volleyball
Wrestling

Baseball
The 2001-2002 Baseball team won the 2A IHSAA Baseball State Championship defeating Batesville High School by a score of 9–8.

See also
 List of high schools in Indiana

References

External links
 Official website

Buildings and structures in Wabash County, Indiana
Public high schools in Indiana
Education in Wabash County, Indiana